Major-General Sir Archibald Buchanan Ritchie, KBE CB CMG (14 May 1869 – 9 July 1955) was a British Army officer, who commanded the 11th (Northern) Division and 16th (Irish) Division during the First World War.

Military career
Ritchie was born in 1869, the son of John Ritchie, an artillery officer who would later rise to the rank of Major-General. He was educated at the United Services College and the Royal Military College, Sandhurst, before joining the Seaforth Highlanders on 1889. He saw service in the Nile Campaign of 1898, and was promoted to captain on 2 May 1898. When the Second Boer War broke out in late 1899, Ritchie was temporarily appointed Adjutant of the newly established 4th (Militia) Battalion of the West Yorkshire Regiment, which was sent to South Africa. He was twice mentioned in despatches for his service and returned to the United Kingdom in March 1902.

On the outbreak of the First World War, Ritchie was a Lieutenant-Colonel commanding the 1st Battalion Seaforth Highlanders, based in India. The battalion was mobilised as part of the 7th (Meerut) Division in Indian Expeditionary Force A, and sent to France, where it arrived in October 1914, and first saw action on 7 November. He remained with the battalion during the Battle of Neuve Chapelle in March 1915, where his commander praised him as "most reliable". and later in the year was promoted and given command of 26th Brigade in 9th (Scottish) Division. He led the brigade at the Battle of Loos (1915) and the Battle of the Somme (1916) before being promoted to command the 11th (Northern) Division in December 1916. He was wounded in May 1917, and in 1918 returned to command 16th (Irish) Division.

Following the end of the war, Ritchie was confirmed in the rank of Major-General, and commanded 51st (Highland) Division in the Territorial Army from 1923-27 before retiring. In retirement, he was the ceremonial colonel of the Seaforth Highlanders from 1931-39.

References

Sources

|-

|-

|-

British Army major generals
Seaforth Highlanders officers
Companions of the Order of the Bath
British Army generals of World War I
Knights Commander of the Order of the British Empire
Companions of the Order of St Michael and St George
British Army personnel of the Second Boer War
1869 births
1955 deaths
People educated at United Services College
Graduates of the Royal Military College, Sandhurst
British Army personnel of the Mahdist War